Zebaish is a 2020 Pakistani television series premiered on 12 June 2020 on Hum TV. It is written by Bushra Ansari, directed by Iqbal Hussain and produced by Momina Duraid under their banner MD Production. Based on the life of actors in the film industry, it features Zara Noor Abbas, Asad Siddiqui, Zoya Nasir, Bushra Ansari, Asma Abbas and Babar Ali.

Plot 
The show highlights certain issues of Pakistani society including the backwardness of certain areas of Pakistan where people like Pirzada Wasif; being "Pir" think that they can run the society according to their own opinions and views and can dominate other people on this basis. The other issue is regarding the film industry of Pakistan where certain women like Pirzadi Noushaba deviate from the right path and for the sake of getting fame, sacrifice their loved ones and their morals and start walking on the wrong path.

Cast 
 Zara Noor Abbas as Noushaba “Noushi”—Daughter of Nadira & Pirzada Nafees-ud-din 
 Asad Siddiqui as Nadeem
 Bushra Ansari as Shahana—Nadeem's mother 
 Asma Abbas as Nadira—a courtesan, Pirzada Nafees-ud-din's wife & Noushaba's mother
 Zoya Nasir as Natasha “Tashi”—Munshi's daughter 
 Babar Ali as Pervaiz—Javed's best friend
 Qavi Khan as Pir Sahab—Pirzadi Salma's father, Wasif & Nafeesudin's chacha, Noushaba's grandfather
 Adnan Shah Tipu as Pirzada Qasim—a husband of two wives and wants to marry Noushaba
 Alyy Khan
 Shabbir Jan as Javed—an alcoholic racer, lawyer and gambler, Shahana's first husband, Nadeem's father & Pervaiz's best friend
 Iqbal Hussain as Wasif—Pirzada Nafees-ud-din's brother & Pirzadi Salma's husband
 Shaheen Khan as Natasha's mother and a widow 
 Salma Zafar as Sania
 Akbar Islam
 Hammad Shoaib as Dilawer
 Sadaf Nasir as Salma—Wife of Wasif
 Sajid Shah as Nafees ud-din
 Fatima Zahra Malik as Nazo

Production 
After the experience of worked with Zara Noor Abbas, Asma Abbas and Bushra Ansari in historical drama Deewar-e-Shab, Iqbal Hussain decided to cast the same trio in upcoming project. In October 2019, the serial was announced by Abbas through her Instagram account. It marked the second on-screen collaboration of real life couple Abbas and Siddiqui after Challawaa. The first and second teaser was released on 8 May 2020 saying that it would be released after Eid from June 2020.

Controversy 
The critics Lubna Faryad from YouTube channel, "Amma TV Aur Mein" criticized the show, to which Bushra Ansari wrote, "This is cheap commentry, they (critics) are the coronas in our lives". The social media trolls Ansari and her comments. Later, Ansari apologises to drama critics, said she overreacted.

References

External links 
Official website

2020 Pakistani television series debuts
2020 Pakistani television series endings
Urdu-language television shows
Hum TV original programming